Chartres River is one of the two largest watercourses on West Falkland, along with the Warrah River.

References

Rivers of West Falkland